George Goddard (December 15, 1815 – January 12, 1899) was a Mormon pioneer and a leader in the Church of Jesus Christ of Latter-day Saints (LDS Church).

Goddard was born in Leicester, England. He was converted to the LDS Church in January 1851. He and his wife and children emigrated from England to Utah Territory, arriving in Salt Lake City on 1852-09-15.

In 1857 and 1858, Goddard served as a church missionary to Canada. From 1856 to 1883, Goddard was the clerk to LDS Church presiding bishop Edward Hunter. From 1874 to 1884, Goddard was the clerk of the LDS Church's biannual general conferences.

In 1872, Goddard became the inaugural first assistant to George Q. Cannon, the first superintendent of the Deseret Sunday School Union. Goddard served in this capacity for 26 years, until his death in 1899. Goddard was also a member of the Mormon Tabernacle Choir and a patriarch in the church. He died in Salt Lake City and was buried at Salt Lake City Cemetery.

Goddard is credited with having first printed the LDS Church's Articles of Faith in card form, having published several thousand copies for the church's Sunday School on February 18, 1878.

References

Andrew Jenson. Latter-day Saints Biographical Encyclopedia, vol. 1.

Further reading
 

1815 births
1899 deaths
19th-century Mormon missionaries
Converts to Mormonism
English emigrants to the United States
English leaders of the Church of Jesus Christ of Latter-day Saints
English Mormon missionaries
Counselors in the General Presidency of the Sunday School (LDS Church)
Tabernacle Choir members
Mormon missionaries in Canada
Mormon pioneers
Patriarchs (LDS Church)
People from Leicester
Burials at Salt Lake City Cemetery
19th-century American musicians